Rebra is a peak in the Chornohora region of Ukraine, with a height of 2,001 meters above sea level.

References 
 Географічна енциклопедія України: в 3-х томах / Редколегія: О. М. Маринич (відпов. ред.) та ін. — К.: «Українська радянська енциклопедія» імені М. П. Бажана, 1989.
 Highest peaks of Carpathians

Eastern Carpathians
Mountains of Ukraine
Two-thousanders of Ukraine